Stefano Sibani (born 6 October 1951) is a retired Italian volleyball player. He was part of Italian teams that finished eighth at the 1976 Summer Olympics and ninth at the 1980 Summer Olympics.

References

1951 births
Living people
Olympic volleyball players of Italy
Volleyball players at the 1976 Summer Olympics
Volleyball players at the 1980 Summer Olympics
Italian men's volleyball players